Zhu Jinhong (born 24 November 1976) is a Chinese diver. She competed in the women's 10 metre platform event at the 1992 Summer Olympics.

References

External links

1976 births
Living people
Chinese female divers
Olympic divers of China
Divers at the 1992 Summer Olympics
Place of birth missing (living people)
Medalists at the 1997 Summer Universiade
Universiade gold medalists for China
Universiade medalists in diving
20th-century Chinese women